John Howland Wood Jr. (March 31, 1916 – May 29, 1979) was an American lawyer and judge from Texas.  He served as a United States district judge of the United States District Court for the Western District of Texas before being assassinated by contract killer Charles Harrelson outside Wood's home in San Antonio, in 1979. Wood's killing was the first assassination of a federal judge in the 20th century.

Early life and education

Wood was born on March 31, 1916, to a prominent pioneer Texas family in Rockport, Texas. His great-great-grandfather, John Howland Wood, settled in Texas in 1836 and founded the towns of Rockport and Woodsboro, and took part in the Texas Revolution and American Civil War. His grandfather was a popular Democratic sheriff of Bexar County. Wood's father, John H. Wood Sr., was also a lawyer. Wood attended Thomas Jefferson High School in San Antonio, Texas. He received his Bachelor of Business Administration degree from St. Mary's University, Texas in 1935 and his Bachelor of Laws from the University of Texas School of Law in 1938.

Career

Wood was in private practice in San Antonio from 1938 to 1970 with the law firm Beckmann, Stanard & Olson, except from 1944 to 1945, when he served as an ensign in the United States Navy during World War II. Wood was in the United States Naval Reserve from 1945 to 1954, as a lieutenant.

Federal judicial service

Wood was nominated by President Richard Nixon on October 7, 1970, to the United States District Court for the Western District of Texas, to a new seat created by 84 Stat. 294. Confirmed by the United States Senate on November 25, 1970, he received his commission on December 1, 1970. He served until his assassination in San Antonio on May 29, 1979.

Assassination

On May 29, 1979, Judge Wood was killed in San Antonio, by a shot from a high-powered rifle as he stood at the door of his automobile. He was struck in the small of the back and the bullet lodged near the upper part of his chest. Wood, known as "Maximum John" for his harsh sentencing of drug traffickers, was assassinated by Charles Harrelson in a contract killing placed by Texas drug lord Jamiel Chagra, who was awaiting trial before the judge. Wood's killing was the first assassination of a federal judge in the 20th century. (Two other federal judges were assassinated in the 1980s, Richard J. Daronco in 1988 and Robert Smith Vance in 1989.) President Jimmy Carter described his assassination as "an assault on our very system of justice."

Honors

John H. Wood Middle School, in San Antonio is named in his honor. The federal courthouse in San Antonio is also named for Wood.

See also
 List of assassinated American politicians
 List of United States federal judges killed in office

References

Sources

External links
 

1916 births
1979 deaths
20th-century American judges
20th-century American lawyers
Assassinated American judges
Assassinated American politicians
Deaths by firearm in Texas
Jefferson High School (San Antonio, Texas) alumni
Judges of the United States District Court for the Western District of Texas
People from Rockport, Texas
Military personnel from San Antonio
People murdered in Texas
Male murder victims
St. Mary's University, Texas alumni
United States district court judges appointed by Richard Nixon
University of Texas School of Law alumni